Raleigh Hotel may refer to:

Raleigh Hotel (South Fallsburg, New York)
Raleigh Hotel (Washington D.C.)
Raleigh Hotel (Miami Beach)
Sir Walter Raleigh Hotel